This is a list of villages in Wundwin Township, Meiktila District, Mandalay Region, Myanmar.

References

 Wundwin